Vanda miniata, the rust-red ascocentrum, is a species of orchid found in Assam, Laos, Thailand, Vietnam, Java, Malaysia, Philippines, Sumatra. It was formerly known as Ascocentrum miniatum and was the type species of the genus Ascocentrum, now synonymous with Vanda.

References

External links 

miniata
Orchids of Assam
Orchids of Java
Orchids of Laos
Orchids of Malaysia
Orchids of the Philippines
Orchids of Sumatra
Orchids of Thailand
Orchids of Vietnam